Lyonetia ledi is a moth in the  family Lyonetiidae. It is found in most of Europe, except Great Britain, Ireland, the Iberian Peninsula, Italy and the Balkan Peninsula.

The wingspan is 8–9 mm.

The larvae feed on Myrica gale and Ledum palustre. They mine the leaves of their host plant. The mine starts as a narrow corridor with a central frass line, that runs along the leaf margin towards the tip. From there a blotch is made. Small leaves may be mined out completely. They make a few slits in the side of the blotch away from the tip, through which most of the frass is ejected. Finally the larvae leave the mine, to make new blotches in one or two more leaves. Pupation takes place outside of the mine in a cocoon that hangs freely.

External links
bladmineerders.nl 
Swedish Moths
Fauna Europaea

Lyonetiidae
Moths of Japan
Moths of Europe